Carom may refer to:

 Ajwain (Trachyspermum ammi), an herb in Indian cuisine
 Carom billiards (also known as Carambole)
 Ricochet, a rebound, bounce or skip off a surface, particularly in the case of a projectile
 Carrom, a family of South Asian tabletop games

See also 
 Caromb, a commune in Vaucluse, France